Anthony Francis Nugent, 11th Earl of Westmeath,  (11 January 1870 – 12 December 1933), styled Lord Delvin from 1879 to 1883, was an Irish peer. He was elected a Representative Peer in 1901. Lord Westmeath occupied properties at Pallas and Spring Garden, Tynagh, County Galway.

Educated at Oratory School, South Kensington, and Christ Church, Oxford University. He served as an Honorary Attaché to Washington 1895–1897, and as Assistant Secretary to the Royal Commission to inquire into French Treaty Rights in Newfoundland in 1898. From 1898 to 1901 he was Assistant Private Secretary to the Secretary of State for the Colonies. He held the office of Deputy Lieutenant of County Galway, and was a Justice of the Peace.

Lord Westmeath was appointed to the Privy Council of Ireland in the 1902 Coronation Honours list published on 26 June 1902, and was sworn in by the Lord Lieutenant of Ireland, Earl Cadogan, at Dublin Castle on 11 August 1902. He was appointed a member of the Senate of the Royal University of Ireland in December 1902.

He died without issue. All his titles devolved upon his youngest surviving brother, Gilbert Nugent.

References

 Tynagh Millennium Review (pp. 42–45), Tynagh & District Development Society Ltd., 2000.

External links
 http://www.thepeerage.com/p48657.htm#i486563
 

People from County Galway
1870 births
1933 deaths
Irish representative peers
Irish unionists
Members of the Senate of Southern Ireland
Members of the Privy Council of Ireland
Earls of Westmeath
Deputy Lieutenants of Galway
Alumni of Christ's College, Cambridge